Iveta is a given name. Notable people with the name include:

People

Iveta Apkalna (born 1976), Latvian organist
Iveta Bartošová (1966–2014) was a Czech singer, actress and celebrity
Iveta Benešová (born 1983), Czech tennis player
Iveta Dudová, Czech former football striker
Iveta Grigule (born 1964), Latvian Member of the European Parliament
Iveta Karafiátová (born 1988), Slovak female ice hockey forward
Iveta Lutovská (born 1983), pageant titleholder from Czech Republic
Iveta Luzumová (born 1989), Czech handballer player for Mios Biganos and the Czech national team
Iveta Matoušková (born 1987), Czech handballer player for Start Elbląg and the Czech national team
Iveta Mazáčová (born 1986), Czech athlete who specialises in the sprint disciplines 60 m, 100 m and 200 metres
Iveta Mukuchyan (born 1986), Armenian-German singer and model
Iveta Pole (born 1981), Latvian theatre and film actress
Iveta Radičová (born 1956), former Prime Minister of Slovakia
Iveta Šranková (born 1963), Slovak former field hockey player who competed in the 1980 Summer Olympics
Iveta Staša-Šaršūne (born 1976), Latvian curler
Iveta Tonoyan (born 1981), Armenian politician and journalist
Iveta Vacenovská (born 1986), Czech table tennis player
Iveta Zelingerová (born 1972), Czechoslovakian-Czech cross country skier who competed from 1992 to 1998

Feminine given names
Czech feminine given names
Given names derived from plants or flowers
Latvian feminine given names
Slovak feminine given names